Juracrista perculta is an extinct species of squat lobster in the family Munididae. It was extant during the Jurassic Period.

References

Squat lobsters
Fossil taxa described in 2012